Miyuki Matsuhisa-Hironaka (松久-広中 ミユキ, born August 15, 1945) is a retired Japanese artistic gymnast who competed at the 1968, 1972 and 1976 Summer Olympics. She had her best results in 1968, when her team placed fourth and she shared ninth place on the balance beam.

References

1945 births
Living people
Gymnasts at the 1968 Summer Olympics
Gymnasts at the 1972 Summer Olympics
Gymnasts at the 1976 Summer Olympics
Olympic gymnasts of Japan
Japanese female artistic gymnasts
20th-century Japanese women